Bahía de Cartagena Trophy is played at Estadio Cartagonova in Cartagena, Spain.

List of Champion 

1994 Real Madrid. Real Madrid 6-2 Feyenoord.
1995 SC Freiburg. SC Freiburg 3-1 Real Madrid.
1996 Slovan Bratislava.  Slovan Bratislava 2-1 FC Barcelona.
1997 NOT HELD.
1998 Real Madrid. Real Madrid 3-1 Borussia Mönchengladbach.
1999 Real Madrid. Real Madrid 1-1 Perugia.
2000 NOT HELD.
2001 Real Madrid. Real Madrid 5-1 FC Cartagena.
2002 Real Betis. Real Betis 2-0 Real Madrid.

Titles 

 4 titles:  Real Madrid: 1994, 1998, 1999 and 2001.
 1 title:  SC Freiburg: 1995.
 1 title:  Slovan Bratislava: 1996.
 1 title:  Real Betis: 2002.

Notes and references
Trofeo Bahía de Cartagena
Real Madrid Friendly matches

Spanish football friendly trophies
Sport in Cartagena, Spain